The Vanishing Legion is a 1931 American pre-Code Western film serial from Mascot, directed by Ford Beebe and B. Reeves Eason.

Stars Harry Carey and Edwina Booth were originally intended to be in the studio's previous serial, King of the Wild, but had to be re-cast when the MGM film Trader Horn (1931) overran its schedule. Both also starred in the Mascot serial The Last of the Mohicans and Carey was the lead in The Devil Horse. An infection received while filming Trader Horn led to Booth's retirement from acting. Boris Karloff supplied the voice of the serial's mystery villain, "The Voice".

Plot
Masked mystery villain The Voice is out to sabotage the Milesburg Oil Co. "Happy" Cardigan needs to successfully drill for oil before his contract with Milesburg expires or he goes broke. Jimmie Williams' father, Jed (Edward Hearn), has been framed for murder. Secretary Caroline Hall appears to have an ulterior motive. The mysterious "Vanishing Legion" is also on the scene. Jimmie and Cardigan team up, along with Jimmie's horse Rex, to defeat The Voice and solve the mysteries surrounding Milesburg.

Cast
Harry Carey as "Happy" Cardigan, drilling for oil before his contract expires
Edwina Booth as Caroline Hall, Hornbeck's secretary
Rex the Wonder Horse as Rex, King of Wild Horses, whom only Jimmie can ride
William Desmond as Milesburg Sheriff
Frankie Darro as Jimmie Williams, whose father is wanted for murder, teams up with Cardigan to unmask The Voice
Philo McCullough as Stevens
Yakima Canutt as Yak
Joe Bonomo as Stuffy
Tom Dugan as Warren, a Milesburg Oil Company director
Lafe McKee as Hornbeck, a lawyer for the Milesburg Oil Company
Bob Kortman as Marno, henchman of The Voice
Paul Weigel as Larribee, a Milesburg Oil Company director 
Olive Carey as Nurse Lewis
Boris Karloff as the voice of The Voice, the serial's masked mystery villain

Chapter titles
 Voice from the Void
 Queen of the Night Riders
 The Invisible Enemy
 The Fatal Message
 The Trackless Trail
 The Radio Riddle
 The Crimson Clue
 Doorway of Disaster
 When Time Stood Still
 Riding the Whirlwind
 Capsule of Oblivion
 Hoofs of Horror [sic]
Source:

See also
 Harry Carey filmography
 Boris Karloff filmography
 List of film serials
 List of film serials by studio

References

External links

1931 films
American black-and-white films
1930s English-language films
Films directed by B. Reeves Eason
Films directed by Ford Beebe
Mascot Pictures film serials
1931 Western (genre) films
American Western (genre) films
Works about petroleum
Films produced by Nat Levine
1930s American films